Tlaltenco metro station is a Mexico City Metro station in Tláhuac, Mexico City. It is an at-grade station with one island platform, served by Line 12 (the Golden Line), between Zapotitlán and Tláhuac metro stations. Tlaltenco metro station serves the town of San Francisco Tlaltenco, from which it receives its name. The station was opened on 30 October 2012, on the first day of the Mixcoac–Tláhuac service.

The facilities are accessible for people with disabilities as there are elevators, tactile pavings and braille signage plates. In 2019, the station had an average daily ridership of 3,492 passengers, making it the 192nd busiest station in the network and the least busy of the line. Since it was opened, Tlaltenco metro station has had multiple incidents, including a 20-month closure in 2014 due to structural faults found in the elevated section of the line, a closure caused by the 19 September 2017 earthquake, and the subsequent collapse of the track near Olivos station in 2021.

Location
Tlaltenco is a metro station along Canal del Acalote Avenue, in the Tláhuac borough, in southeastern Mexico City. The station serves , a town in the borough. Within the system, the station lies between Zapotitlán and Tláhuac metro stations.

Exits
There are two exists:

Northeast: Canal del Acalote Avenue and Victoria Street, San Francisco Tlaltenco.
Northwest: Canal del Acalote Avenue and Zacatenco Street, San Francisco Tlaltenco.

History and construction
Line 12 of the Mexico City Metro was built by Empresas ICA, in association with Alstom Mexicana and Grupo Carso.

The station was opened on 30 October 2012, on the first day of the Mixcoac–Tláhuac service. The facilities are accessible for people with disabilities as there are elevators, tactile pavings and braille signage plates. The pictogram represents a stone gateway located in the town.

Incidents
Since 2010, the Superior Auditor of the Federation has audited Line 12 several times and has reported several faults – like cracks and detachments – along the line, including some inside Tlaltenco metro station and at the Tlaltenco–Tláhuac interstation.

From 12 March 2014 to 29 November 2015, Tlaltenco was closed due to technical and structural faults in the stretch Atlalilco–Tláhuac. On 28 August 2017, a passenger jumped to the tracks and survived. He was in a state of intoxication and was fined $400,000 pesos. After the 19 September 2017 earthquake damaged Line 12 tracks, Tlaltenco remained closed until 30 October 2017. The earthquake derailed a train in the Tlaltenco–Zapotitlán overpass. From 23 April to 28 June 2020, the station was temporarily closed due to the COVID-19 pandemic in Mexico. On 3 May 2021, Tlaltenco metro station was closed after a portion of Line 12's elevated railway collapsed near Olivos station.

Ridership
According to the data provided by the authorities, the Tlaltenco metro station has been one of the least busy stations of the system's 195 stations. Except for the years when the station was closed for several months, commuters have averaged per year between 2,100 and 3,500 daily entrances. In 2019, before the impact of the COVID-19 pandemic on public transport, the station's ridership totaled 1,274,784 passengers, which was an increase of 155,870 passengers compared to 2018. In the same year, Tlaltenco was the 192nd busiest of the system and it was the least used of the line.

Gallery

Notes

References

External links

2012 establishments in Mexico
Accessible Mexico City Metro stations
Mexico City Metro Line 12 stations
Mexico City Metro stations in Tláhuac
Railway stations opened in 2012